Tell Me Tomorrow is the seventh studio album by American R&B singer Angela Bofill, released on September 26, 1985 by Arista Records. This was her last release on Arista before taking a three-year break and moving to Capitol Records.  The album was produced by keyboardist George Duke.

Track listing
Side one
"Generate Love" (Dennis Lambert, Franne Golde)
"Tell Me Tomorrow" (David Lasley, Randy Goodrum)
"Midnight Shine" (Brian Potter, Frank Wildhorn)
"I Don't Wanna Come Down (From Love)" (Angela Bofill, Alan Palanker)

Side two
"First Time" (David Batteau, Don Freeman, Michael Sembello)
"This Change of Yours" (Louise Porter, Mathew Davis)
"Still in Love" (Derek Bramble)
"Woman's Intuition" (Sam Lorber, Tom Campbell)
"(If You Wanna Love Me) You're On" (Davis Innes, Jimmy Scott, Sam Lorber)

External links

1985 albums
Angela Bofill albums
Arista Records albums